Carlo Alessandro Guidi (14 June 1650 – 12 June 1712), Italian lyric poet, was born at Pavia.

Biography 
As chief founder of the well-known Roman Academy of the Arcadians, he had a considerable share in the reform of Italian poetry, which at that time was dominated by the baroque extravagance of the poets Giambattista Marini and Claudio Achillini and their school. Guidi, Giovanni Mario Crescimbeni, and the critic and jurisconsult Gravina attempted to foster a straightfoward use of language.

The genius of Guidi was lyric in the highest degree; his songs are written with singular force, and charm the reader, in spite of touches of bombast. His most celebrated song is that entitled Alla Fortuna (To Fortune), was a much admired work of poetry in the 17th century.

Guidi was squint-eyed, humpbacked, and of a delicate constitution, but possessed undoubted literary ability. His poems were printed at Parma in 1671, and at Rome in 1704. In 1681 he published at Parma his lyric tragedy Amalasunta in Italy, and two pastoral dramas Daphne and Endymion. The last had the honor of being mentioned as a model by the critic Gravina, in his treatise on poetry.

Less fortunate was Guidi's poetical version of the six homilies of Pope Clement XI, first as having been severely criticized by the satirist Settano, and next as having proved to be the indirect cause of the author's death. A splendid edition of this version had been printed in 1712, and the pope being then in Castel Gandolfo, Guidi went there to present him with a copy. On the way he found out a serious typographical error, which he took so much to heart that he was seized with a stroke at Frascati and died on the spot.

Guidi was honoured with the special protection of Ranuccio II, duke of Parma, and of Queen Christina of Sweden.

Works 
 Poesie liriche d'Alessandro Guidi consagrate all'Altessa Serenissima di Ranuccio II Farnese duca di Parma, e di Piacenza. In Parma: per li Viotti, 1671
 Il Giove d'Elide fulminato, introduzione al balletto fatto dalla serenissima signora duchessa di Parma l'anno 1677. Nel teatrino del serenissimo signor duca poesia d'Alessandro Guidi, posta in musica da d. Marco Uccellini maestro di capella della medesima altezza, Parma, 1677
 Amalasonta in Italia. Dramma d'Alessandro Guidi, posto in musica dal Maestro di cappella Gio: Battista Policci, e fatto rappresentare dal serenissimo signor duca di Parma nel Teatro del Collegio de' Nobili l'anno 1681. In Parma: per Galeazzo Rosati Stampator Ducale, 1681
 Amore riconciliato con Venere, introduzione al balletto fatto dalla serenissima signora duchessa di Parma l'anno 1681. nel Teatrino del serenissimo signor duca poesia d'Alessandro Guidi, posta in musica dal Maestro di cappella Gio: Battista Policci. In Parma: per Galeazzo Rosati Stampator Ducale, 1681
 Accademia per musica fatta nel real palazzo della maesta della regina Christina per festeggiare l'assonzione al trono di Giacomo secondo re d'Inghilterra, versi d'Alesandro Guidi. In Roma: nella stamperia della Reu. Cam. Apost., 1687 
 L' Endimione di Erilo Cleoneo pastore arcade con un discorso di Bione Crateo all'eminentiss. e reverendiss. sig. cardinale Albano. In Amsterdam: appresso la vedoua Schippers, 1692
 Pensieri heroici, spiegati dalla penna d'Alessandro Guidi. Dedicati all'illustrissimo Nicolò Foscarini. In Venetia: appresso Alvise Pavin, 1695; In Parma: per Giuseppe Rossetti, 1695
Poesie d'Alessandro Guidi non più raccolte, con la sua vita novamente scritta dal signor canonico Crescimbeni e con due ragionamenti di Vincenzo Gravina non più divulgati, Verona, G. A. Tumermani, 1726
 Le basiliche di S. Francesco di Asisi e della Madonna degli Angeli, descritte da Alessandro Guidi, postovi innanzi un compendio della vita di esso serafico padre. Roma: Tip. poliglotta, 1873

References

External links
 

1650 births
1712 deaths
16th-century Italian writers
Italian poets
Italian male poets
Members of the Academy of Arcadians